Lemnos is one of the regional units of Greece. It is part of the region of North Aegean. The regional unit covers the islands of Lemnos, Agios Efstratios and a few smaller, uninhabited islands, in the Aegean Sea.

Administration

As a part of the 2011 Kallikratis government reform, the regional unit Lemnos was created out of part of the former Lesbos Prefecture. It is subdivided into 2 municipalities. These are (number as in the map in the infobox):

Lemnos (3)
Agios Efstratios (2)

Province
The province of Lemnos was one of the provinces of the Lesbos Prefecture. It had the same territory as the present regional unit. It was abolished in 2006.

References

 
Provinces of Greece
Regional units of the North Aegean